Elachista humilis is a moth of the family Elachistidae found in most of Europe.

Description
Adults are on wing from May to July. There are two generations per year.The head is grey, face whitish. Forewings light grey irrorated with dark fuscous ; a very indistinct oblique whitish fascia before middle, usually partly or wholly obsolete ; a small tornal spot and larger triangular spot on costa somewhat beyond it ochreous-white.Hindwings are grey..

Biology
Larvae have been recorded on bent (Agrostis species), sweet vernal grass (Anthoxanthum odoratum), sedge (Carex species), tufted hairgrass (Deschampsia cespitosa), fescue (Festuca species), Yorkshire fog (Holcus lanatus), reed canary grass (Phalaris arundinacea) and smooth meadow-grass (Poa pratensis), but tufted hairgrass is the main hostplant. The other host plants are not all equally trustworthy because of possible confusion with Elachista canapennella.

The young larvae make a short corridor that is stuffed with frass in spring. After hibernation, they vacate this mine and make a number of elongated blotches, all descending from the leaf tip.

Distribution
It is found in most of Europe, except the Iberian Peninsula and the Balkan Peninsula.

References

External links
 UKmoths
 bladmineerders.nl

humilis
Leaf miners
Moths described in 1850
Moths of Europe
Taxa named by Philipp Christoph Zeller